
Massachusetts Public Records Law is a law in Massachusetts detailing what kinds of documents are actually public records. It is a state law that is similar to the federal Freedom of Information Act, which was signed into law by Lyndon B. Johnson in 1966. According to the Boston Globe newspaper in 2016, "Massachusetts is currently the one state in the country where the Legislature, judiciary, and governor’s office all claim to be completely exempt from the [public records] law." Many voters would welcome more government transparency. For example, in 2020, a "ballot question in 16 house districts found overwhelming support for increasing transparency." Interest groups focusing on the issue include Act on Mass and the New England First Amendment Coalition.

Requirements
The government and other agencies are required under the Public Records Act to disclose records and documents upon request.  There are exemptions to Public Records Act that the government can use to keep certain records private. 
The Massachusetts Public Records Law parallels FOIA.  All records including photographs, memos, books, papers, maps, recorded tapes, financial statements, statistical tabulations, or other documentary materials or data are considered public information in Massachusetts, unless they are withheld from public view under one of the sixteen exemptions.

See also
 Massachusetts Archives
 Copyright status of works by subnational governments of the United States

References

Further reading

  (about "bill updating and giving teeth to the Massachusetts’ public records law, described as one of the weakest in the country")
 . ("Agencies are charging exorbitant fees for records, effectively denying access by making it unaffordable")

External links
 Massachusetts Public Records Act on Sunshine Review
 Open Government Guide to Massachusetts
 
 
 

Massachusetts statutes
Freedom of information legislation in the United States
History of Massachusetts